The D-8 Organization for Economic Cooperation, also known as Developing-8, is an organisation for development co-operation among the following countries: Bangladesh, Egypt, Indonesia, Iran, Malaysia, Nigeria, Pakistan, and Turkey. The objectives of D-8 Organization for Economic Cooperation are to improve member states' position in the global economy, diversify and create new opportunities in trade relations, enhance participation in decision-making at international level, and improve standards of living. D-8 is a global arrangement rather than a regional one, as the composition of its members reflects. Organization for Economic Cooperation (D-8) is a forum with no adverse impact on bilateral and multilateral commitments of the member countries, emanating from their membership to other international or regional organizations.

The combined population of the eight countries is about 1 billion or 60% of all Muslims, or close to 13% of the world's population and covering an area of 7.6 million square kilometers, 5% of world land area. In 2006, trade between the D-8 member states stood at $35 billion, and it was around $68 billion in 2010. Transactions between the 8 developing countries accounted for 3.3 percent of world trade in 2010.

History
The idea of co-operation among major Muslim developing countries was mooted by Prof. Dr. Necmettin Erbakan, the then Prime Minister of Turkey, during a Seminar on "Cooperation in Development" which was held in Istanbul in October 1996. The group envisioned co-operation among countries stretching from South East Asia to Africa. Representatives from Bangladesh, Egypt, Indonesia, Iran, Malaysia, Nigeria and Pakistan attended the Seminar. This conference was the first step towards the establishment of D-8 and it was only after a series of preparatory meetings that D-8 was set up officially and began its activities with the Istanbul Declaration issued at the end of the summit of Heads of State and Government held in Istanbul on 15 June 1997

Purposes and objectives
As stated by the D-8 Facts and Figures Publication: "The objectives of D-8 are to improve developing countries' positions in the world economy, diversify and create new opportunities in trade relations, enhance participation in decision-making at the international level, and provide better standards of living." The main areas of co-operation include finance, banking, rural development, science and technology, humanitarian development, agriculture, energy, environment, and health.

In the first Summit Declaration (Istanbul, 1997), the main objective of D-8 is stated to be socio-economic development in accordance with the following principles:
Peace instead of conflict.
Dialogue instead of confrontation.
Cooperation instead of exploitation.
Justice instead of double standard.
Equality instead of discrimination.
Democracy instead of oppression.

By the same token, D-8 is a forum with no adverse impact on bilateral and multilateral commitments of the member countries, emanating from their membership of other regional or international organizations.

The fifth D-8 Summit Declaration (Bali, 2006) produced the following, as illustration of the application of the group's objectives:
Commitment to work together to solve the problem of economic disparities within our countries.
Reaffirm commitment to enhance co-operation in the field of energy to develop alternative and renewable energy resources.
Emphasize the importance of D-8 in contributing to the economic development of its member countries and ensure that it promotes global trade.

Structure
:

The Summit, which is convened every two years, has the highest level of authority, and is composed of the leaders of each member state.

The Council is the principal decision-making body and forum for consideration of issues relating to the and is composed of the foreign affairs ministers of each member state.

The Commission has executive authority, and is composed of Commissioners appointed by beach member state's government. Commissioners are responsible for promoting compliance with directives in their respective nation. Finally, an executive director is appointed by D-8 members to facilitate communication and to act in a supervisory capacity during each summit or lower-level assembly.

D-8 Summits

Member countries

Secretaries-General of D-8

See also 
Newly industrialised country
Next Eleven

References

External links
 

D-8 Member States Statistics
D-8 Publications
Preferential Trade Agreement
Agriculture and Food Security

 
International economic organizations
Islamic organizations based in Turkey
International organizations based in Turkey
Organizations based in Istanbul
Intergovernmental organizations
Foreign relations of Pakistan
Foreign relations of Iran
Foreign relations of Turkey
Foreign relations of Nigeria
Foreign relations of Bangladesh
Foreign relations of Indonesia
Foreign relations of Egypt
Foreign relations of Malaysia